Miro Tenho (born 2 April 1995) is a Finnish professional footballer who plays for HJK as a centre-back.

Career

Inter Turku
On 3 January 2019, Tenho signed with Inter Turku. Tenho played 31 games for the club, before leaving at the end of the year.

HJK
HJK Helsinki confirmed on 4 November 2019, that Tenho would join the club for the 2020 season, signing a deal until the end of 2021.

Honours 
Individual

 Veikkausliiga Team of the Year: 2022

References

External links

1995 births
Living people
People from Kaarina
Sportspeople from Southwest Finland
Finnish footballers
Association football midfielders
Veikkausliiga players
Ykkönen players
Kakkonen players
Åbo IFK players
Turun Palloseura footballers
FC Inter Turku players
Helsingin Jalkapalloklubi players